This is a list of games developed or published by Taito, a Japanese game developer and publisher.

Electro-mechanical games
The following titles were arcade electro-mechanical games (EM games) manufactured by Taito.

Video games

See also

Taito
Square Enix
List of Square Enix video games
List of Square Enix mobile games

References

External links
 List of Taito games at MobyGames
 Taito Arcade Hardware at System 16
 The Killer List of Videogames

Taito